Hercegszántó is a village in the Bács-Kiskun County of Hungary, famous for being the birthplace of footballer Flórián Albert. Residents are Magyars, with minority of Serbs and Croats. 
Until the end of World War II, the Danube Swabians lived in this village, it was the only village of Stifulder, in the Bács-Kiskun county. Stifulder are a Roman Catholic Subgroup of the Danube Swabians whose Ancestors once came at the 17th century and 18th century from Fulda (district). Majority of the Danube Swabians was expelled to Allied-occupied Germany and Allied-occupied Austria in 1945–1948, about the Potsdam Agreement.

A border crossing into Serbia is located near Hercegszántó. The Serbian town of Bački Breg lies across the border. It is also only a few kilometres away from Croatia.

References

Populated places in Bács-Kiskun County
Hungary–Serbia border crossings
Serb communities in Hungary